Polygraff was a quarterly anthology of short stories in science fiction, fantasy, horror, pulp, cyberpunk, and other genres of speculative fiction. It was available in print since 2009. As of July 2010, Polygraff had completed its first volume of publication, consisting of 4 issues.

The contents of Polygraff included short stories, an editorial, publication reviews and interviews. The magazine featured an in-depth interview with Gor author John Norman in Volume 1, Issue No. 2. This was the only known interview with Mr. Norman currently in print (at that time).

See also
Polymancer magazine, another publication by the company that produces Polygraff.

References

Notes
Polygraff Volume 1, Issue No. 1 (2009)
Polygraff Volume 1, Issue No. 2 (2010)
Polygraff Volume 1, Issue No. 3 (2011)
Polygraff Volume 1, Issue No. 4 (2012)

External links
Polymancer Studios, Inc., the publisher of Polygraff
Official magazine sampler on ScribD

2009 establishments in Canada
Quarterly magazines published in Canada
Science fiction magazines published in Canada
Magazines established in 2009